Macarthur Heights is a new premium residential estate of Sydney, in the local government area of the City of Campbelltown, in the State of New South Wales, Australia, 45 kilometres (direct line) south-west of the Sydney central business district. It is part of the Macarthur region and is located between the M31 Motorway and Western Sydney University. The fledgling suburb consists mainly of new housing, 2 small feature parks and an astronomical observatory. The principal access road is Goldsmith Avenue.

History
Macarthur Heights is constructed on open land formerly owned by Western Sydney University. Construction of Stage 1 of the new suburb began in 2013. The street names reflect an astronomical theme, including Milky Way and Orion Street.

Gates of Light
A prominent feature of the new suburb is the "Gates of Light" sculpture, located in Main Ridge Park opposite the observatory, which recognises the contribution which the Observatory made to the area. The sculpture, by prize-winning artist Khaled Sabsabi, is illuminated at night and features the various astronomical constellations. Adjacent to the sculptures, large concrete spheres have been placed, to represent the planets.

Observatory
The Campbelltown Rotary Observatory, formerly stood on a hilltop close to where the "Gates of Light" are now situated. The hilltop was bulldozed and the Observatory was relocated to make way for the new development. It now stands closer to the university on the highest point in the suburb.

Transport
The nearest railway station is Macarthur and various bus routes are accessible on Narellan Road and at Macarthur

References

See also
 Campbelltown City Council
 https://mhcommunitygroup.com.au/

Suburbs of Sydney